Groves High School may refer to:

Groves High School (Georgia), Garden City, Georgia
Birmingham Groves High School, Beverly Hills, Michigan
Port Neches–Groves High School, Port Neches, Texas
Webster Groves High School, St. Louis, Missouri

See also
 Grove High School (disambiguation)
 Grove School (disambiguation)